Basiloterus is an extinct genus of late-Eocene primitive whale from the Drazinda Formation, Pakistan and possibly also the Barton Group (originally Barton Beds) of England.

Basiloterus husseini is the closest known relative of Basilosaurus, but was not as large or elongated. The holotype is known from partial post cranial remains including two lumbar vertebrae.

See also 

 Evolution of cetaceans

References

Bibliography 
   

Basilosauridae
Prehistoric cetacean genera
Bartonian genera
Eocene mammals of Asia
Fossils of Pakistan
Eocene mammals of Europe
Fossils of England
Fossil taxa described in 1997